Bangkhlanoi Sor.Thanikul is a retired Thai Muay Thai fighter.

Biography and career

Rak Saiyon was born in the Rayong Province and grew up in the Bang Khla District from the Chachoengsao Province. He started Muay Thai training at the Lukklongtan camp and fought in Chachoengsao until he was big enough to fight in Bangkok where he was scouted by the Songchai promotion in 1978. From then he was training at the Sor.Thanikul camp owned by famous promotor Klaew Thanikhul.

Bangkhlanoi became a top fighter in the smaller weight classes, beating notable champion Samransak Muangsurin and the famous Payakaroon brothers Kongtoranee Payakaroon and Samart Payakaroon. He captured the 102 lbs Lumpinee Stadium title in 1979 and the 108 lbs title in 1981.

Bangkhlanoi defeated hard puncher Mafuang Weerapol on 24 August 1982 for the Lumpinee Stadium 118 lbs title. They rematched on 24 December 1982 at Rajadamnern Stadium. Bangkhlanoi won by decision and received the "Best Fighter Award" from the hands of Princess Maha Chakri Sririndhorn.

Bangkhlanoi became less dominant in the second half of the 1980s. He had a trilogy memorable for its violence against Paiboon Fairtex in 1986. Bangkhlanoi retired in 1988.

Titles and accomplishments
Lumpinee Stadium
 1979 Lumpinee Stadium 102 lbs Champion
 1981 Lumpinee Stadium 108 lbs Champion
 1982 Lumpinee Stadium 118 lbs Champion

Awards
 1982 H.R.H. Princess Maha Chakri Sirindhorn Best Fighter

Fight record

|-  style="background:#fbb;"
| 1988– || Loss ||align=left|Cherry Sor Wanich ||   || Bangkok, Thailand || Decision  || 5 || 3:00

|-  style="background:#fbb;"
| 1987-05-19||Loss||align=left|Daothongnoi Sitdaothong || Lumpinee Stadium || Bangkok, Thailand || Decision || 5 || 3:00

|-  style="background:#fbb;"
| 1987-02-06||Loss||align=left|Panrit Luksrirat || Lumpinee Stadium || Bangkok, Thailand || Decision || 5 || 3:00

|-  style="background:#c5d2ea;"
| 1987-01-13|| Draw||align=left|Panrit Luksrirat || OneSongchai, Lumpinee Stadium || Bangkok, Thailand || Decision || 5 || 3:00

|-  style="background:#cfc;"
| 1986-12-10|| Win ||align=left|Paiboon Fairtex || Huamark Stadium || Bangkok, Thailand || KO (Elbow)|| 3 ||

|-  style="background:#cfc;"
| 1986-10-24|| Win ||align=left|Paiboon Fairtex || OneSongchai, Lumpinee Stadium || Bangkok, Thailand || Decision || 5 || 3:00

|-  style="background:#fbb;"
| 1986-09-29||Loss||align=left|Paiboon Fairtex || Rajadamnern Stadium || Bangkok, Thailand || Decision || 5 || 3:00

|-  style="background:#fbb;"
| 1985-10-11|| Loss ||align=left|Wisanupon Saksamut || Lumpinee Stadium || Bangkok, Thailand || Decision || 5 || 3:00

|-  style="background:#fbb;"
| 1985-09-03|| Loss ||align=left|Sanit Wichitkriangkrai ||  || Bangkok, Thailand || Decision || 5 || 3:00

|-  style="background:#;"
| 1985-03-06|| ||align=left|Payannoi Sor.Tassanee || OneSongchai + Thanikul, Rajadamnern Stadium || Bangkok, Thailand || Decision || 5 || 3:00

|-  style="background:#fbb;"
| 1985-02-|| Loss||align=left|Chanchai Sor Tamarangsri ||Lumpinee Stadium || Bangkok, Thailand || Referee stoppage|| 5 || 

|-  style="background:#fbb;"
| 1985-01-08|| Loss ||align=left|Manasak Sor Ploenchit ||OneSongchai, Lumpinee Stadium  || Bangkok, Thailand || Decision || 5 || 3:00

|-  style="background:#cfc;"
| 1984-11-09|| Win ||align=left|Palannoi Kiatanan || OneSongchai, Lumpinee Stadium || Bangkok, Thailand || Decision || 5||3:00

|-  style="background:#fbb;"
| 1984-10-19|| Loss ||align=left|Maewnoi Sitchang || OneSongchai, Lumpinee Stadium || Bangkok, Thailand || Decision || 5 || 3:00

|-  style="background:#fbb;"
| 1984-09-06|| Loss ||align=left|Saencherng Pinsinchai || Rajadamnern Stadium || Bangkok, Thailand || Decision || 5 || 3:00

|-  style="background:#fbb;"
| 1984-06-12|| Loss ||align=left| Kanongsuk Sitomnoi || Lumpinee Stadium || Bangkok, Thailand || Decision || 5 || 3:00

|-  style="background:#cfc;"
| 1984–|| Win ||align=left|Lukyad Muangsurin ||  || Bangkok, Thailand || Decision || 5 || 3:00

|-  style="background:#fbb;"
| 1983-12-28|| Loss  ||align=left|Kongtoranee Payakaroon || Rajadamnern Stadium || Bangkok, Thailand || Decision || 5||3:00

|-  style="background:#cfc;"
| 1983-11-11|| Win ||align=left|Lankrung Kiatkriangkrai || OneSongchai, Lumpinee Stadium || Bangkok, Thailand || Decision || 5||3:00

|-  style="background:#fbb;"
| 1983-10-13|| Loss ||align=left|Kongtoranee Payakaroon || Rajadamnern Stadium || Bangkok, Thailand || Decision || 5||3:00

|-  style="background:#cfc;"
| 1983-08-26|| Win ||align=left|Palannoi Kiatanan || OneSongchai, Lumpinee Stadium || Bangkok, Thailand || Decision || 5||3:00

|-  style="background:#fbb;"
| 1983-04-05 || Loss ||align=left|Sornsilp Sitnoenpayom || Lumpinee Stadium || Bangkok, Thailand || Decision || 5 || 3:00 
|-
! style=background:white colspan=9 |

|-  style="background:#fbb;"
| 1983-02-04|| Loss ||align=left|Samransak Muangsurin || Lumpinee Stadium || Bangkok, Thailand || TKO || 3 ||

|-  style="background:#cfc;"
| 1982-12-24|| Win ||align=left|Mafuang Weerapol || OneSongchai + Thanikul, Rajadamnern Stadium || Bangkok, Thailand || Decision || 5 || 3:00 
|-
! style=background:white colspan=9 |

|-  style="background:#fbb;"
| 1982-09-20 || Loss ||align=left|Samransak Muangsurin || Lumpinee Stadium  || Bangkok, Thailand || KO || 2||

|-  style="background:#cfc;"
| 1982-08-24|| Win ||align=left|Mafuang Weerapol || Lumpinee Stadium || Bangkok, Thailand || Decision || 5 || 3:00 
|-
! style=background:white colspan=9 |

|-  style="background:#fbb;"
| 1982-06-22|| Loss ||align=left|Mafuang Weerapol || Onesongchai, Lumpinee Stadium || Bangkok, Thailand || Decision || 5 || 3:00

|-  style="background:#cfc;"
| 1982-05-27 || Win ||align=left|Samransak Muangsurin || Rajadamnern Stadium  || Bangkok, Thailand || Decision || 5|| 3:00

|-  style="background:#cfc;"
| 1982-04-|| Win||align=left|Fonluang Luksadetmaephuangthong || Rajadamnern Stadium || Bangkok, Thailand || Decision || 5 || 3:00

|-  style="background:#c5d2ea;"
| 1982-03-12|| Draw||align=left|Fonluang Luksadetmaephuangthong || OneSongchai, Lumpinee Stadium || Bangkok, Thailand || Decision || 5 || 3:00 
|-
! style=background:white colspan=9 |

|-  style="background:#cfc;"
| 1982-02-|| Win ||align=left|Fahkhamram Lukprabat || Rajadamnern Stadium || Bangkok, Thailand || Decision || 5 || 3:00

|-  style="background:#cfc;"
| 1982-01-15|| Win ||align=left|Kongtoranee Payakaroon || Lumpinee Stadium || Bangkok, Thailand || Decision || 5 || 3:00

|-  style="background:#cfc;"
| 1981-11-06|| Win ||align=left|Phayanoi Sor.Tasanee ||  || Nakhon Ratchasima, Thailand || Decision || 5 || 3:00

|-  style="background:#cfc;"
| 1981-10-13|| Win ||align=left|Chakrawan Kiatsaktewan || Lumpinee Stadium || Bangkok, Thailand || Decision || 5 || 3:00

|-  style="background:#cfc;"
| 1981-03-31|| Win ||align=left|Makhamphet Rojsongkhram || Lumpinee Stadium || Bangkok, Thailand || Decision || 5 || 3:00 
|-
! style=background:white colspan=9 |

|-  style="background:#cfc;"
| 1980-12-18|| Win ||align=left|Sangasak Na Nontachai || Rajadamnern Stadium || Bangkok, Thailand || Decision || 5 || 3:00

|-  style="background:#fbb;"
| 1980-09-23|| Loss ||align=left|Samart Payakaroon || Lumpinee Stadium || Bangkok, Thailand || Decision || 5 || 3:00

|-  style="background:#cfc;"
| 1980-06-27|| Win ||align=left|Samart Payakaroon || Lumpinee Stadium || Bangkok, Thailand || Decision || 5 || 3:00

|-  style="background:#fbb;"
| 1980-06-06|| Loss ||align=left|Kongtoranee Payakaroon || Lumpinee Stadium || Bangkok, Thailand || Decision || 5 || 3:00 
|-
! style=background:white colspan=9 |

|-  style="background:#cfc;"
| 1980-01-22|| Win ||align=left|Semer Ketsongkram || Lumpinee Stadium || Bangkok, Thailand || Decision || 5 || 3:00

|-  style="background:#c5d2ea;"
| 1979-10-02|| Draw||align=left|Kongtoranee Payakaroon || OneSongchai, Lumpinee Stadium || Bangkok, Thailand || Decision || 5 || 3:00 
|-
! style=background:white colspan=9 |

|-  style="background:#cfc;"
| 1979-06-26|| Win ||align=left|Kongtoranee Payakaroon || Lumpinee Stadium || Bangkok, Thailand || Decision || 5 || 3:00 
|-
! style=background:white colspan=9 |

|-  style="background:#cfc;"
| 1979-04-20|| Win ||align=left|Yodphon Pongsing ||OneSongchai, Lumpinee Stadium || Bangkok, Thailand || Decision || 5 || 3:00

|-  style="background:#cfc;"
| 1979-02-27|| Win ||align=left|Ekasit Kor.Kerdphol || Onesongchai, Lumpinee Stadium || Bangkok, Thailand || Referee Stoppage|| 4 ||

|-  style="background:#fbb;"
| 1978-10-27|| Loss ||align=left|Kongtoranee Payakaroon || OneSongchai, Lumpinee Stadium || Bangkok, Thailand || Decision || 5 || 3:00

|-  style="background:#cfc;"
| 1978-01-17|| Win ||align=left|Denchai Pornphisanu || Onesongchai, Lumpinee Stadium || Bangkok, Thailand || Decision|| 5 || 3:00

|-
| colspan=9 | Legend:

References

1962 births
Living people
Bangkhlanoi Sor.Thanikul
Bangkhlanoi Sor.Thanikul